Coast to Coast is the second studio album by Irish boy band Westlife. It was also the band's second album to be released as a five-piece. It was released on 6 November 2000 by RCA Records. Five hit singles were released from the album: "Against All Odds", "My Love", "What Makes a Man", "I Lay My Love on You" and "When You're Looking Like That". The album was a commercial success in both Ireland and the United Kingdom, selling 1.8 million copies in Britain alone. The album was the third-best selling of 2000 in Britain. As of October 2001, it sold seven million copies worldwide.

In January 2005, the album was re-issued in a two-in-one box set compilation with the group's third album, World of our Own (2001). A video album, entitled Coast to Coast - Up Close and Personal, was released on 27 November 2000. It peaked at number one on the UK Visual Chart and a certified 3× Platinum.

Background
The band said that Coast to Coast was a step up from their first album, having more variety than Westlife. For example, the song "Angel's Wings", written by Steve Mac, Wayne Hector and Jimmy MacCarthy, is about a newborn baby. In a 2018 interview with the band, Shane Filan said that the album title, Coast to Coast, was taken from a line in their song "My Love" ('overseas from coast to coast'), and also because they're from the two coasts of Ireland. Filan also said that the track "Close" is the most underrated song of Westlife, described it as a "great song", and wondered why it has never been released as a single.

Singles
"Against All Odds", a collaboration with Mariah Carey, was released on 15 September 2000, as the lead single from the album. Carey originally released her version of the song a few months earlier, as the third single from her seventh studio album, Rainbow (1999). 

"My Love" was released on 31 October 2000 as the second single from Coast to Coast. It debuted at number one on the UK Singles Chart and become the band's seventh UK number one. "What Makes a Man" was released on 18 December 2000 as the third single off the album. It peaked at number two and was their first single not to peak at number one on the UK Singles Chart.

"I Lay My Love on You" was released as the fourth single in many parts of the world, including Australia, Asia and most notably Europe, excluding the UK and Ireland. "When You're Looking Like That" was released on 19 September 2001 as the fifth and final single from the album in Australia, Asia, Latin America and Europe.

Critical reception
Coast to Coast received negative reviews from music critics. Andrew Lynch from Entertainment.ie gave the album two out of five stars, calling it "just another cynical collection of formulaic pop". However, the album was reviewed more positively at AllMusic and Rovi, who both gave the album two and half stars, comparing Westlife to other boy bands such as Take That and Boyzone.

Commercial performance
Coast to Coast entered the UK Albums Chart at number one, with 234,767 copies sold in its first week, making it Westlife's fastest selling album to date. The album remained at number one for only one week, being replaced by The Beatles' compilation album 1. In April 2011, the album was certified six times Platinum by the British Phonographic Industry for shipments of nearly two million copies in the United Kingdom. Up to November 2011, the album had sold 1,685,971 copies in the United Kingdom, becoming Westlife's biggest-selling studio album there. A gold sales award disc was issued to the band to commemorate sales in excess of 115,000 copies sold in Mexico. The album was also certified Gold in Brazil by ABPD, for sales of over 100,000 copies. As of October 2001, it sold seven million copies worldwide.

Where Dreams Come True Tour

The Where Dreams Come True Tour was the second concert tour by Westlife in support of their second studio album, Coast to Coast. It was seen by 600,000 fans and was nicknamed "The No Stools Tour" due to the band's reputation of performing while perched on stools.

Track listing

Notes
"Against All Odds" or "Against All Odds (Take a Look at Me Now)".
"Fragile Heart" is also referred to as "A Fragile Heart" according to music repertoires.
Tracks 19 to 29 do not contain any audio.
Track 30 is a hidden bonus track not credited on the album.

Personnel

Joakim Agnas – Piccolo Trumpet
John Amatiello – Assistant
Dick Beetham – Mastering
Martin Brannigan – Arranger
Mariah Carey – Vocals (background), Producer, Vocal Arrangement
Andreas Carlsson – Vocals (background)
Dana Jon Chappelle – Engineer
Simon Cowell – Executive Producer
Andy Earl – Photography
Björn Engelmann – Mastering Cutting Room Studios
Brian Garten – Digital Editing
Paul Gendler – Guitar, Guitar (Electric)
Wayne Hector – Vocals (background), Vocal Arrangement
Matt Howe – Orchestral Arrangements, Mixing Engineer
Jimmy Jam – Producer
Henrik Janson – Arranger, Conductor
Fredrik Karlsson – Guitar (Electric)
David Krueger – Guitar (Acoustic), Arranger, Guitar (Electric), Producer

Josef Larossi – Mixing
Chris Laws – Programming, Engineer
Terry Lewis – Producer
Gustave Lund – Percussion
Tom Lundberg – Bass
Steve Mac – Piano, Arranger, Keyboards, Producer, Vocal Arrangement, Mixing
Per Magnusson – Arranger, Keyboards, Programming, Producer
Max Martin – Vocals (background)
Richard Niles – Assistant Engineer
Esbjörn Öhrwall – Guitar
Steve Pearce – Bass
Daniel Pursey – Assistant Engineer
Rami – Producer, Engineer
Ake Sundqvist – Percussion
Mary Ann Tatum – Vocals (background)
Ulf – Arranger, Conductor
Anders Von Hofsten – Vocals (background)
Westlife – Vocals (background)

Source: Discogs

Charts

Weekly charts

Year-end charts

Decade-end charts

Certifications and sales

Release history

References

2000 albums
Westlife albums
RCA Records albums
Sony BMG albums
Albums produced by David Kreuger
Albums produced by Per Magnusson
Albums produced by Rami Yacoub
Albums produced by Steve Mac
Albums recorded at Cheiron Studios